Pungert is a small settlement on the right bank of the Sora River in the Municipality of Škofja Loka in the Upper Carniola region of Slovenia.

References

External links

Pungert at Geopedia

Populated places in the Municipality of Škofja Loka